WGFA-FM is an Adult Contemporary formatted broadcast radio station licensed to Watseka, Illinois, serving Central Illiana.  WGFA-FM is owned and operated by Iroquois County Broadcasting Company. It is a class B FM broadcasting on 94.1 FM.

The station began broadcasting March 2, 1962.

References

External links
 94.1 WGFA Online
 

GFA-FM
Mainstream adult contemporary radio stations in the United States
Radio stations established in 1962
1962 establishments in Illinois